Andrew Horatio Reeder (July 12, 1807 – July 5, 1864) was the first governor of the Territory of Kansas.

Biography
Reeder was born in Easton, Pennsylvania to Absolom Reeder and Christina (Smith) Reeder. He was educated at an academy in Lawrenceville, New Jersey. He read law in a Pennsylvania law office and was admitted to the bar there in 1828. In 1831, he married Frederika Amalia Hutter. Together they had three sons and seven daughters.

Career
Reeder was a very loyal member of the Democratic Party and supported the idea of popular sovereignty which dealt with territories' decisions on the issue of slavery. On June 29, 1854, President Franklin Pierce appointed Reeder to the office of the governor of the territory of Kansas and remained in office until August 16, 1855, when he was fired.

Reeder took the oath of office on July 7 and arrived in Kansas on October 7. He served until April 17, 1855, when he left the territory, making Daniel Woodson acting territorial governor. Reeder returned to the Kansas Territory on June 23. As governor of the Territory of Kansas, Reeder was a proponent of the controversial Kansas-Nebraska Act, which let each territory's residents decide whether to allow or prohibit slavery. On March 30, 1855, one of the biggest voting frauds took place, when neighboring Missourians came into the Kansas Territory to vote illegally on the issue of Kansas being admitted into the US as a free state or a slave state. The incident caused border violence between Kansas and Missouri, part of the Bleeding Kansas period. Reeder refused to ratify the results, called for a new election to fill the vacancies, and designated the townsite of Pawnee as the meeting place for the first territorial legislature.

Pierce formally dismissed Reeder for his refusal to use his position to aid in making Kansas a slave state. In May 1856, facing indictment for high treason, he left the territory disguised as a woodchopper.

Reeder returned to Pennsylvania and remained in politics, joining the recently founded Republican Party.  On the first ballot for the vice-presidential nomination taken by delegates to the 1860 Republican National Convention, Reeder received fifty-one votes, which put him in fourth place behind the eventual nominee, Hannibal Hamlin.

Death
Andrew Horatio Reeder died in Easton, Pennsylvania, on July 5, 1864, and is buried in Easton Cemetery. Reeder Street on College Hill is named for him.

References

External links

Andrew Horatio Reeder at The Political Graveyard

1807 births
1864 deaths
19th-century American politicians
American lawyers admitted to the practice of law by reading law
Governors of Kansas Territory
Kansas Democrats
Lawrenceville School alumni
Pennsylvania Republicans
Politicians from Easton, Pennsylvania